Imaizumi's red-backed vole (Myodes imaizumii) is a species of vole in the family Cricetidae. It is found in Japan and was initially designated as a subspecies of the Japanese red-backed vole, with studies of cranial and molar patterns supporting this. However, genetic tests in the late 1990s provide support for the theory that M. imaizumii is indeed a separate species, and it is now considered such pending the completion of more detailed studies.

References
Musser, G. G. and M. D. Carleton. 2005. Superfamily Muroidea. pp. 894–1531 in Mammal Species of the World a Taxonomic and Geographic Reference. D. E. Wilson and D. M. Reeder eds. Johns Hopkins University Press, Baltimore.

Myodes
Mammals described in 1961